|}

The Mercury Stakes is a Group 3 flat horse race in Ireland open to thoroughbreds aged two years or older. It is run at Dundalk over a distance of 5 furlongs (1,006 metres), and it is scheduled to take place each year in October.

The race was first run in 2008. It was previously run a Listed race before being upgraded to Group 3 status in 2018. The 2020 race was run in memory of Pat Smullen, an Irish champion jockey who rode his first and last winners at Dundalk, who died in September 2020.

Winners

See also
 Horse racing in Ireland
 List of Irish flat horse races

References

Racing Post:

External links
 horseracingintfed.com – International Federation of Horseracing Authorities – Mercury Stakes (2018).

Flat races in Ireland
Open sprint category horse races
Dundalk Stadium
Recurring sporting events established in 2008
2008 establishments in Ireland